The following is a list of productions by American Hip hop producer, Khrysis. The record labels are in parentheses next to the album titles.

2003

Cesar Comanche – Paper Gods (D.O.T.F.W. Music)

10. "Daily Operation" (Featuring L.E.G.A.C.Y., & Sean Boog) (Produced by 9th Wonder; co-produced by Khrysis)
11. "Wrong Religion"

Justus League – N.C. State Of Mind (Hall of Justus)

Disc 1:
04. Cesar Comanche – "Wrong Religion"
07. The Away Team – "The Blah Blah"
15. The Away Team – "On" (Featuring Cesar Comanche)

Disc 2:
02. The Away Team – "Let Off A Round"
04. Little Brother – "Love Is"
08. The Away Team – "On The Line" (Featuring Rapper Big Pooh, Chaudon, & Joe Scudda)

2004

Masta Ace – A Long Hot Summer (M3 Macmil Music)

05. "Da Grind" (Featuring Apocalypse) (Sratches by DJ JS-One)

Little Brother – The Chittlin' Circuit – The Mixtape (Roy Lee's Records & Tapes)

02. "Starvation" (Featuring Chaudon) (Sratches by DJ JS-One)

VA – Definition. The Hip-Hop Compilation (Neblina Records)

10. EAF – "Streetwise Remix"

2005

Rapper Big Pooh – Sleepers (6 Hole Records, Inc)

02. "I Don't Care " (Sratches by DJ Flash)
03. "Strongest Man"
06. "Just Friends"
07. "Live Life" (Featuring O-Dash, & Spectac)
08. "My Mind" (Featuring O-Dash, & Darien Brockington)
14. "The Fever"

The Away Team – National Anthem (6 Hole Records, Inc)

01. "And Now Folks..."
02. "The Competition"
03. "Likka Hi"
04. "The Shining"
05. "Come On Down" (Featuring Smif-N-Wessun)
06. "The Blah Blah"
07. "So I Tells The Bitch Right..."
08. "Fuck You"
09. "Let Off A Round"
10. "Me And My Fellows..."
11. "Make It Hot" (Featuring Joe Scudda, & Phonte)
12. "The End Of The Day"
13. "Upnatem"
14. "One-N-Only" (Featuring Percy Miracles)
15. "Always Be Around"
16. "On The Line" (Featuring Rapper Big Pooh, Chaudon, & Joe Scudda)
17. "Caution"
18. "Lights Out"

Little Brother – The Minstrel Show (Atlantic)

13. "Watch Me" (Scratches by DJ Jazzy Jeff)

Little Brother – The Chittlin Circuit 1.5 (Fastlife)

02. "Third Party" (Featuring Joe Scudda)
12. "Starvation" (Featuring Chaudon)
17. "Khrysis Shoutro"

Sean Price – Monkey Barz (Duck Down)

03. "Onion Head" (Featuring Tek)
11. "Bye Bye" (Featuring Buckshot)

L.E.G.A.C.Y. – Project Mayhem (6 Hole Records, Inc)

02. "Mayhem"
03. "Too Long"
05. "Pure" (Featuring Phonte)
07. "Throw Something"
15. "I'm A Star" (Featuring Chaundon, Joe Scudda, & Median)

VA – NBA 2K6: The Tracks (Decon)

11. Jean Grae – "The Jam"

Kaze & 9th Wonder – Spirit Of '94: Version 9.0 (Brick Records)

02. "Locked In Chains"

Cesar Comanche – Squirrel And The Aces (ABB)

03. "The Grind" (Featuring Supastition)
09. "Big Game Hunters" (Featuring Joe Scudda, & Tajai)
14. "Rockin It" (Featuring Sean Boog)
16. "All Praises Due"

Edgar Allen Floe – True Links (MCEO Records)

04. "Back In Time"

The Thyrday – The Perfection Experiment 2 (Street Flava Entertainment)

01. "PX2 Intro"
07. "Rutherford Affair"
08. "Fan"
10. "Cycle"

Smif-n-Wessun – Tek & Steele: Reloaded (Duck Down)

04. "Gunn Rap"
06. "Sick Em Son"

Median – The Path To Relief (not on label)

01. "Cool" (Featuring Phonte)
08. "Freestyle Outro"

K-Hill – Stamps Of Approval (Kick-A-Verse Recordings)

05. "Walk In My Shoes (Remix)" (Featuring L.E.G.A.C.Y., & Sean Boog)
08. "Heavenly Father"

VA – Undercover Cuts 24 (Undercover Mag)

06. The Away Team – "The Shinin'"

Splash – The Ripple Effect (Amp Truth Records)

12. "Right On Time"

Justus League – Triple Play: The EP (6 Hole Records, Inc)

02. Rapper Big Pooh – "Tellin' Me"
03. Rapper Big Pooh – "Keep The Bling"
05. The Away Team – "Shitty"
06. The Away Team – "Do It" (Featuring Joe Scudda, & L.E.G.A.C.Y.)
07. The Away Team – "Come On Down" (Featuring Smif-n-Wessun)
08. The Away Team – "Family Ties"
11. L.E.G.A.C.Y. – "The Death List" (Featuring The Away Team)
13. The Away Team – "Who's That" (Featuring L.E.G.A.C.Y., & Phonte)

VA – Hall Of Justus Presents: Soldiers Of Fortune (ABB)

04. The Away Team – "Grind Season"
09. L.E.G.A.C.Y. – "I Want To Know"
10. Rapper Big Pooh – "Keep It To The Side" (Featuring Skyzoo)
12. Jozeemo – "Feelings"
13. Hall Of Justus – "Where I'm From (Hall Of Justus Remix)" (Featuring Buddy Klein, E. Jones, Jozeemo, Phocuz, Skyzoo, & Vandalyzm)
17. Hall Of Justus – "Tour Of Duty" (Featuring Purple St. James)
18. Embassy & Big Dho – "Seeing Is Believing"
19. The Away Team & Chaundon – "Do It Again"

2006

Kenn Starr – The Starr Report (Halftooth Records)

26. "The Same"

Kenn Starr – Starr Status (Halftooth Records)

10. "Waitin' On You"

Edgar Allen Floe – Floe Almighty (Shaman Work)

03. "Craftmatic "

Darien Brockington – Somebody To Love (Hall Of Justus, ABB Soul)

02. "Think It Over" (Produced by 9th Wonder, co-produced by Khrysis)
04. "Don't Say Goodbye" (Produced by Khrysis, co-produced by Sheldon "Official" Williams)
13. "Thank You" (Keyboards by Sheldon "Official" Williams)

Little Brother & DJ Drama – Separate But Equal (Heat Entertainment)

08. "Rollin Out" (Featuring Supastition)
09. "Macaroni"
12. "Hate"
15. "Boondock Saints" (Featuring Chaudon, & L.E.G.A.C.Y.)

2007

Sean Price – Jesus Price Supastar (Duck Down)
05. "Stop"
10. "King Kong" (Featuring Rock)
13. "Directors Cut"

Mick Boogie & Little Brother – And Justus For All (Mixtape) (Hall Of Justus)
09. Phonte – "A Word From Our Sponsors" (Featuring Von Pea)
17. Little Brother – "The Pressure" (Featuring Cormega)
24. Little Brother – "Back At It (Khrysis Remix)"

Skyzoo – Corner Store Classic (Mixtape)
12. "Braggin Rights"

Sean Price – Master P (Duck Down)
04. "The Huckabuck"
13. "Jamaican"
18. "Psycho Ward (Music From Mic Tyson)"

Median – Relief In The Making (Mixtape) (Halftooth Records)
06. Median – "Rize"
15. Median – "Personified (Remix)"
18. L.E.G.A.C.Y. – "I'm A Star" (Featuring Chaundon, Joe Scudda, & Median)
21. Median – "Yeah Right"

Joe Scudda – The Authentic (Mixtape) (Hall Of Justus)
03. "Poppin'"
05. "So Much Drama" (Featuring L.E.G.A.C.Y.)
07. "Bad Habits" (Featuring L.E.G.A.C.Y., & Sean Boog)
12. "Too Real" (Featuring Big Pooh)
13. "Each Day"
14. "Let Me Know" (Featuring L.E.G.A.C.Y., Chaundon, & Sean Boog)
15. "Do It"
16. "What Up"
18. "Balougagoon Season"
26. "Wanted Man" (Featuring L.E.G.A.C.Y., & Median)
27. "Door To My Life"
30. "F@!K Outta Here"

Median – Median's Relief (Halftooth Records)
05. "Rize" (Featuring LaDehra)
14. "2 Side Coin (Remix)" (Featuring L.E.G.A.C.Y., & Spectac)
15. "Personified (Super-Charged Remix)"

Supastition – Guest Of Honor (Mixtape) (Reform School Music)
06. Little Brother – "Rollin' Out" (Featuring Supastition)
16. Little Brother – "Doin' Me" (Featuring Supastition)

Little Brother – Getback (ABB, Hall Of Justus)
06. "After The Party" (Featuring Carlitta Durand)
11. "Dreams" (Produced by Rashid Hadee, co-produced by Khrysis, & Phonte)

Cormega – Who Am I? (Legal Hustle Entertainment)
12. "The Rap Game" (Featuring Little Brother)

Supastition – Leave Of Absence (Reform School Music)
05. "Word Has It"

Jozeemo – Cry Now Laf Later (Defend Music Inc.)
05. "I'm That Nigga"
14. "Lose It" (Featuring Little Brother)
15. "Feelings"

The Away Team – Training Day (Hall Of Justus)
01. "Scream Out!"
02. "Look At Me" (Featuring Nervous Reck)
03. "Sum Of Me" (Featuring Darien Brockington, & Evidence)
04. "Awesome" (Featuring Billionz)
05. "The Odds"
06. "Steppin On Toes"
07. "Chitter Chatter" (Featuring Black Milk)
08. "Rock A Bye" (Featuring Nervous Reck, & Supastition)
09. "Greedy"
10. "Don't Wait"
11. "Psycho Ward" (Featuring Sean Price)
12. "I'm A Fool"

2008

Torae – Daily Conversation (Internal Affairs)

03. "Somethin' To See"
10. "Save The Day" (Featuring Kel Spencer, & Sha Stimuli)
11. "The Nigguz Is Comin'" (Featuring Tash)

Tanya Morgan – Tanya Morgan Is A Rap Group (Okayplayer Records)

21. "Bout To Be Some"

VA – Juice CD Volume 80 (Juice Magazin)

04. Little Brother – "The Getaway"

Jean Grae – The Orchestral Files (Deluxe Edition) (Babygrande)

Disc 2:
04. "The Jam"

Jean Grae – Jeanius (Blacksmith Music)

08. "#8"
09. "American Pimp" (Featuring Median)

Torae – Allow Me To Reintroduce Myself (not on label)

01. "Heard It All Before" (Featuring Emilio Rojas)
06. "Crash"
09. "Told You That" (Featuring Chaundon)

Chaundon – Carnage (Hall Of Justus, Defend Music Inc.)

04. "HPNY"
05. "Angie"
09. "Told You That" (Featuring Torae)
10. "Can I Live"

Brooklyn Academy – Presents: Summer School (Gold Dust Media)

02. "Rollout" (Featuring Wordsworth)

Edgar Allen Floe – Floe Almighty: The Remixture (MCEO Records)

02. "Floe Free Style (ShadE Business Remix)"
03. "Craftmatic (Karate Kid Remix)"
14. "Off And On" (Bonus Track)
15. "On Schedule" (Bonus Track)

Rapper Big Pooh – Rapper's Delight (not on label)

02. "Reality Check" (Featuring Big Dho, D. Black, & Mykstro)
04. "Hands Up" (Featuring Chaundon, & Roc 'C')
09. "Crazy"
15. "On The Real" (Featuring E. Ness, & Jozeemo)

DJ K.O. – Picture This... (Shaman Work)

12b. Torae, John Robinson, Talib Kweli, Tiffany Paige – "Someday (Remix)"

Heltah Skeltah – D.I.R.T. (Da Incredible Rap Team) (Duck Down)

03. "The Art Of Disrespekinazation"
04. "D.I.R.T. (Another Boot Camp Clik Yeah Song)"

Vandalyzm – Megatron Majorz  (Starving Artist Entertainment)

05. The Away Team – "Money On The Table (Remix)" (Featuring Vandalyzm)

Little Brother – Separate But Equal (Drama Free Edition)  (Hall Of Justus)

07. "Rollin Out" (Featuring Supastition)
08. "Macaroni"
09. "Boondock Saints" (Featuring Chaudon, & L.E.G.A.C.Y.)

Evidence – The Layover EP  (Decon)

01. "The Layover"
02. "For Whom The Bell Tolls" (Featuring Blu, Phonte, & will.i.am)

2009

Finale – A Pipe Dream And A Promise (Interdependent Media)
04. "The Waiting Game" (Featuring Invincible)

Rapper Big Pooh – The Delightful Bars (The North American Pie Version) (Hall Of Justus)

02. "The Comeback"
09. "Reality Check" (Featuring Big Dho, D. Black, & Mykestro)
13. "The Life" (Featuring Muhsinah)

Rapper Big Pooh – The Delightful Bars (iTunes Exclusive) (Hall Of Justus)

03. "Power" (Featuring O. Dash)
04. "The Comeback"
06. "Hands Up" (Featuring Chaundon, & Roc C)
07. "On The Real" (Featuring Jozeemo, & E. Ness)
11. "The Life" (Featuring Muhsinah)

KRS-One & Buckshot – Survival Skills (Duck Down)

10. "Amazin" (Featuring Loudmouf Choir, & Sean Price)
11. "Hear No Evil"

2010

Blacastan – The Master Of Reality (Brick Records)

11. "It's A Khrysis"
16. "If You Only Knew" (Featuring Big Stat)

Little Brother – LeftBack (Hall Of Justus)

01. "Curtain Call" 
02. "Table For Twor" (Featuring Jozeemo, & Yahzarah)
03. "Tigallo For Dolo" 
04. "Revenge" (Featuring Median, & Truck North)
07. "Go Off Go On"
11. "Get Enough Pt. 2" (Featuring Khrysis)
13. "24" (Featuring Torae)

Big Remo – 9th Wonder Presents Big Remo: Entrapment (It's a Wonderful World Music Group)

02. "What It Takes"
11. "Entrapment" (Featuring Khrysis)

Krondon – Let Em Live

12. "Incline" (Bonus Track)

Slum Village – Villa Manifesto (E1 Records)

01. "Bare Witness" (Featuring DJ Babu)

Copywrite – The Life and Times of Peter Nelson

06. "Best In Show" (Featuring Tage Future & Planet Asia)

9th Wonder – 9th's Opus: It's a Wonderful World Music Group Vol. 1 (IWMMG/ABB)

02. 9thmatic, Big Remo & Khrysis – 1000ft.
12. The Away Team – Bitch Be Gone

Actual Proof – The (Fre)EP (IWWMG/The Academy)
16. Ya Don't Stop (Like This)"

Rapsody – Return of the B-Girl (IWWMG/Jamla)

08. "Return of the B-Girl (Mara Jade)"

Sean Boog – Lights Beers Ahead of You (IWWMG/Jamla)

06. "Drunken Style" (Featuring Add2theMC)
07. "Red Eye"
08. "Takin' It"
09. "Playground"
12. "What It Is" (Featuring Rapsody)
19. "It's Cold (Go Inside)" (Featuring Halo & E. Jones)

2011

Actual Proof – The Talented Tenth (IWWMG/Jamla)

07. "Letta’ to Correta" (Featuring Bird & The Midnight Falcons)
09. "The March"
12. "Detroit Red"
16. "Let Cha Know" (Featuring Big Remo)
19. "Desegregation" (Featuring Thee Tom Hardy & Sean Boog)
20. "The X Factor"

Mac Miller – Best Day Ever (Rostrum Records)

12. "She Said"

Talib Kweli – Gutter Rainbows (Blacksmith/3D/Javotti Media)

06. "I'm On One"

HaLo – Heat Writer II (IWWMG/Jamla)

01. "Topic of Conversation"
02. "Mr. Ben Ready" (featuring Big Remo)
03. "Jammin’ on the One" 
10. "Cold Chillin’"
11. "Follow Me" (featuring GQ)
15. "Nevermind"

King Mez & Khrysis – The King's Khrysis EP (IWWMG/BoardRoom Music)

01. "Reaching Out (Intro)"
02. "Nightmares"
03. "Shine"
04. "From The South" (featuring Thee Tom Hardy & Sean Boog)
05. "Something's Missing"
06. "The King's Khrysis" (featuring Phonte)

TP – TP Is My Hero (IWWMG/Jamla)

01. "Intro" (Featuring Tyler Woods)
02. "Gotta Work' (Featuring King Mez, Halo & Heather Victoria)

Big Remo - L-R-G Presents Robin Hood Ree (IWWMG/LRG/Jamla)

02. "One For The Fam" (featuring The Away Team)
03. "Molotov Ree"
15. "Spark Something" (featuring Tyler Woods & Laws)

Heather Victoria – Graffiti Diary (IWWMG/Jamla)

03. "Missing You" (featuring Big Remo)
05. "Your Lady" (featuring Laws)
06. "Won't Stress Me" (featuring Rapsody)

Sean Boog – The Phantom of the Jamla (IWWMG/Jamla)

01. "Back & Forth"

Elzhi – Elmatic (The Jae.B Group)

12. "Detroit State of Mind Pt. II" (featuring Sean Boog)

Rapsody – Thank H.E.R. Now (IWWMG/Jamla)

10. "Extra Extra" (featuring Halo & Mac Miller)
12. "Blankin' Out (Remix)" (featuring Jean Grae)

Khrysis – "The Hour of Khrysis" (IWWMG/Jamla)

"Love Today" (featuring Laws)

Actual Proof – "Still Hotter Than July" (IWWMG/Jamla)

06. "2 High" (featuring Thee Tom Hardy) 
10. "Rod Strickland" 
16. "Light The World"
17. "Take It Back" (featuring Drique London)

HaLo – "The Blind Poet" (It's A Wonderful World Music Group/Jamla)

02. "Too Strong" (featuring Skyzoo)
03. "Bag" (featuring Charlie Smarts)
04. "Bussin" (featuring 9thmatic)
09. "Magical" (featuring Sean Boog & Thee Tom Hardy) 
13. "Dark Knight"

Phonte – Charity Starts at Home (+FE Music) 

03. "Everything is Falling Down" (Featuring Jeanne Jolly)

The Away Team – Scars & Stripes (IWWMG/Jamla/Duck Down)

01. "Intro"
02. "Bad News" (featuring King Mez & Blue Raspberry)
03. "Scars & Stripes"
04. "4 The People"
05. "Cheers" (featuring Heather Victoria)
06. "What Is This" (featuring Evidence)
07. "The Road To Redemption"
08. "Drift"
09. "Set It Off" (featuring Talib Kweli & Rapsody)
10. "Happenin’ Today"
11. "Hot Potato" (featuring Halo & Sundown)
12. "I Ain’t Mad" (featuring Jay Rush)
13. "Paid" (featuring Laws & Big Remo)
14. "Proceed" (featuring Enigma)
15. "Get Down" (featuring GQ)
16. "Picture This" (featuring Kelsy Lu)
17. "See U Later" (featuring Phonte)

Torae – For the Record (Internal Affairs)

02. "Alive" (featuring Wes)

Rapsody – For Everything (IWWMG/Jamla)

05. "For Everything"
07. "420 pm"
12. "Live It Up" (featuring Bluu Suede)
13. "Rock the Bells" (featuring Kendrick Lamar)

GQ – Troubled Man (IWWMG/Jamla)

05. ACC (featuring Rapsody & Halo)
07. Don't Be Afraid (featuring Halo)
12. Forever In a Day
13. Magnetc (featuring Halo)

Heather Victoria – Hip Hop Soul Lives (IWWMG/Jamla)

04. "Go All In"

2012

Copywrite – God Save The King (Man Bites Dog)

07. "Union Rights" (featuring MHz)

Planet Asia – Black Belt Theatre (Gold Chain Music/Green Streets Entertainment)

01. "Lost And Found"

Rapsody – The Black Mamba EP (IWWMG/Jamla)

05. "Ballin' One" (featuring Tab-One)

Actual Proof – Black Boy Radio (IWWMG/Jamla)

 02. "Live From Cloud 9" 
 06. "Skate Kids II" (featuring Scoopay)
 09. "Fonk It Up (Reprise)"
 15. "The Feel"
 20. "A Letta to Coretta" (featuring Bird & the Midnight Falcons) [*]

Add-2 – S.ave O.ur S.ouls (Not On Label) 

 11. "Keep Walking" (featuring Sundown)

Khryis – fuNkwhatchuheard (IWWMG/Jamla) 

 01. "Turn It On"
 02. "YEAH! YEEEAAAH!!!!"
 03. "Rhode To Riches"
 04. "BONG BONG!"
 05. "Dark Alley Muzik"
 06. "All That Bleepty Bleep"
 07. "Change The World"
 08. "All Black"
 09. "NC!!!"
 10. "Mountain Tops"
 11. "(That's What) She Said"
 12. "Rest In Shine/Love Today" (featuring Laws) [*]
 13. "OKMD" (featuring Oh No) [*]

Big Remo – Sleepwalkers (IWWMG/Jamla) 

 03. "I’m Back" (featuring Rapsody)
 06. "Still Life" (featuring HaLo & 9thmatic)
 08. "You Know"

Sean Boog – Sean Boogie Nights (IWWMG/Jamla) 

 06. "Bug Spray"
 11. "Money Isn't Everything"

Rapsody – The Idea of Beautiful (IWWMG/Jamla) 

 01. "Motivation" (featuring Big Rube)
 08. "Destiny"

Torae – Off the Record (Internal Affairs) 

 04. "Gettin' Biz" (featuring Khrysis)

Sean Price – Mic Tyson (Duck Down) 

 08. "Hush"

2013

GQ – Death Threats & Love Notes: The Prelude 

 12. "I Know" (featuring Rapsody and Rocki Evans)

Locksmith – The Green Box 

 15. "Transitions" (produced with Eric G)

Rapsody – She Got Game 

 03. "Thank You Very Much"
 04. "Everlasting"
 05. "Caught Up" (featuring Raheem DeVaughn)
 07. "Special Way"
 12. "Facts Only"
 20. "The Pressure" (featuring Styles P)

Add-2 & Khrysis – Between Heaven & Hell 

 01. "The Birth"
 02. "Don't Go"
 03. "Club Church/Club Hell"
 04. "The Death Of Chicago"
 05. "The Ugly Side Of Beautiful" (featuring GQ)
 06. "It's Ok" (featuring Rapsody)
 07. "They Call It"
 08. "Runnin'"
 09. "The Glorious"

Talib Kweli – Gravitas 

 01. "Inner Monologue"

Truck North – Murder By Mourning 

 06. "Bitches Brew"

Khrysis – Merry Khrysmas  

 01. "Celebrate"
 02. "Khrysmas Time Is Here"
 03. "Simply"
 04. "Lettin It Snow"
 05. "What The Lonely Do"
 06. "See You At The Crib"
 07. "First Khrysmas"
 08. "Sleigh Jam"
 09. "The Homie Rudolph"
 10. "Its Khrysmas Time"

2014

Various Artists – 9th Wonder Presents: Jamla Is the Squad 
 01. Actual Proof & TP – "God Willin'"
 04. Big Remo, Halo & Rapper Big Pooh – "Bang"
 05. Talib Kweli, Elzhi & Phonte – "No Competition"
 06. Halo, Masta Killa & Talib Kweli – "Pretty Bird"
 07. GQ & Heather Victoria – "Walk On By"
 09. Add-2 – "Bomber & a Fly Chick"
 13. Pete Rock, Lecrae & Rapsody – "Be Inspired"
 22. Add-2 & Sundown – "Knock Knock"

Verbal Kent – Sound of the Weapon 
 01. "Truth"
 02. "Body the Beat" (featuring DJ Eclipse)
 03. "Hunched Over Chessboards" (featuring DJ Eclipse)
 04. "Now or Never, Pt. 1"
 05. "Underrated?"
 06. "Raponomics"
 07. "Sound of the Weapon" 
 08. "No Excuse"
 09. "Now or Never, Pt. 2"
 10. "Sammy Sosa"
 11. "Slap the Shit Out of You"
 12. "Joe Shmoses"
 13. "Now or Never, Pt. 3"

GQ – Rated Oakland
 08. "Last Breath II"
 10. "Nice Guy"

Skyzoo & Torae – Barrel Brothers 
 10. "The Hand Off"

Halo – Mansa Musa
 04. "Galore"
 05. "Secrets" (featuring Tab-One)
 06. "Pretty Birds" (featuring Masta Killa & Talib Kweli)
 09. "Merry Go" (featuring Masta Killa & Charlie Smarts)
 11. "Stop It" (featuring Problem & Bad Lucc)
 12. "Snow Goggles"
 15. "Gorgeous Regular" (featuring Heather Victoria)
 16. "Bonfire" (featuring Sundown)

Problem x LA Leakers – 354 Lift Off
 12. "Hate" (featuring 12Til)

Rapsody – Beauty and the Beast
 04. "Drama"
 06. "The World"

Vstylez – At Oddz Til I'm Even
 08. "LasWonzOut" (featuring Crystal Lucas)
 14. "Live with Schiavone (Road Warriors)"

2015

King Magnetic – Timing Is Everything 
 13. "Let's Get It On" (featuring Smif-N-Wessun, GQ Nothin Pretty & Reef the Lost Cauze)

Add-2 – Prey for the Poor
 02. "Stop Play Rewind" (featuring Rapsody)
 03. "BRB"
 04. "Young Black Boy" (featuring Jamila Woods)
 05. "Say Goodbye"
 07. "Green Light Party"
 09. "One Night" (featuring Raheem DeVaughn)
 10. "On My Soul"
 14. "We Gon Make It"

Mega Trife – Gold Ain't Found Above Ground
 10. "The Groupies"
 13. "Feelin U"

Talib Kweli & 9th Wonder - Indie 500
 04. "Lo-Fi" (featuring Niko Is)
 12. "Technicolor Easels" (featuring Niko Is)
 13. "Understand" (featuring Brother Ali & Planet Asia)

Pearl Gates – Diamond Mind
 03. "Countdown" (featuring Wordsworth & Pav Bundy)

2016

Torae – Entitled
 14. "Shoutro"

Khrysis – MotherFuNker
 01. "30 Minutes Or Less"
 02. "The Staink"
 03. "The GhatDam"
 04. "Drunky Drumer"
 05. "That Bounce"
 06. "Breakin It Down"
 07. "Jammed Out"
 08. "SpookyToof"
 09. "Back To The Blips"
 10. "Don't Fall"
 11. "How Ya Mama Feel"
 12. "The Beginning"

Rapsody – Crown
 06. "Take It Slow" (produced with 9th Wonder)
 08. "2 AM" (featuring Ab-Soul) (produced with 9th Wonder)
 09. "OooWee" (featuring Anderson .Paak)
 10. "Fire" (featuring Moonchild) (produced with Ka$h & 9th Wonder)

GQ
 "Guns Hang High" (featuring Rapsody) (produced with 9th Wonder)

2017

King Magnetic – Everything Happens 4 A Reason
 06. "Alone" (featuring Masta Ace, Slug & DJ Eclipse)

Talib Kweli & Styles P – The Seven
 06. "Let It Burn" (featuring Rapsody & Chris Rivers)

Rapsody – Laila's Wisdom
 03. "Chrome (Like Ooh)" (produced with Ka$h)
 04. "Pay Up" (produced with Ka$h)
 07. "Nobody" (featuring Anderson .Paak, Black Thought & Moonchild) (produced with 9th Wonder)

2018

Jericho Jackson - Elzhi & Khrysis are Jericho Jackson
whole album

Kooley High - Never Come Down
06. "Shambles" (featuring Carlitta Durand)
09. "Cool Out / Tranquility" (co-produced with Kash)
11. "No Favors"

Black Thought – Streams of Thought, Vol. 1
05. "Thank You" (featuring KIRBY)

Various Artists – 9th Wonder Presents: Jamla is the Squad II
 01. Reuben Vincent, Ian Kelly, Heather Victoria, GQ & Rapsody - "Welcome to JamRoc"
 03. Pharoahe Monch - "Crazy"
 05. Jericho Jackson & Conway - "Machine & McQueen"
 06. Don Flamingo - "Ya Heard Me"
 12. Amber Navran - "Good to Me"
 16. GQ - "P.A.N."
 19. Rapsody - "REDBLUE" (featuring JID)
 22. Niko Brim, Swank, Charlie Smarts, GQ & Rapsody - "Goodfellas"

Conway the Machine - EIF 2: Eat What U Kill
09. "Be Proud of Me"

Cam Be - 7 Steps to 7
02. "iDust" (co-produced with Cam Be)

2019

Smif-n-Wessun - The ALL
 02. "Testify"
 04. "Ocean Drive" (featuring Musiq Soulchild & Rapsody)
 06. "Letter 4 U" (featuring Smitty)
 09. "We Good" (featuring GQ & Heather Victoria)
 10. "Stahfallah"
 11. "Illusions"

Murs - The Iliad is Dead and the Odyssey is Over
 04. "Unicorn Glitter"
 11. "Tony Robbins Pocketbook"

Little Brother - May the Lord Watch
 01. "The Feel"
 03. "Everything"
 09. "What I Came For" (co-produced with Phonte)

Rapsody - Eve
 05. "Whoopi"

2020

Conway the Machine - From King to a God
 13. "Jesus Khrysis"

Busta Rhymes - Extinction Level Event 2: The Wrath of God
 15. "Best I Can" (featuring Rapsody) (co-produced with 9th Wonder)

2021

Evidence - Unlearning, Vol. 1
 08. "Talking to the Audience"

DJ Kay Slay - The Soul Controller
 06. "Respect the Architect" (featuring Busta Rhymes, Benny the Butcher, Conway the Machine & PRAYAH) (co-produced with DJ Kay Slay)

2022

Phife Dawg - Forever
03. "Fallback" (featuring Rapsody and Renée Neufville)
07. "Wow Factor" (featuring Maseo)

JID - The Forever Story
 13. "Money"

References

Production discographies
Discographies of American artists
Hip hop discographies